Chimera, originally found in Greek mythology, is a monstrous fire-breathing creature composed of the parts of multiple animals. The term, and often the general concept, has since been adopted by various works of popular culture, and chimeras of differing description can be found in contemporary works of fantasy and science fiction.

Television
 The Chimera was adapted as different monsters in the Super Sentai/Power Rangers franchise:
 Kyoryuu Sentai Zyuranger feature a Chimera-based monster named Dora Chimera with a lion head and torso, a goat head on the chest and goat legs, and a snake-like tail. In Mighty Morphin' Power Rangers, the monster was added into the series as Goatan.
 In Mahou Sentai Magiranger, Meemy creates a Chimera monster by fusing together the spirits of dead monsters. This act is repeated in the shows American counterpart Power Rangers: Mystic Force by Meemy's counterpart Imperious who uses a forbidden spell to fuse the spirits of dead monsters to a Chimera.
 In Mon Colle Knights, the Chimera is depicted as having three heads (a lion head, a goat head, and a hawk head), the body of a lion, and the wings of a dragon.
 There are different Chimeras in the Yu-Gi-Oh! franchise:
 The Bandai card of the Chimera depicted it as a lion with the wings and tail of a dragon.
 Little Chimera is a monster that enables all Fire Monsters to get 500 attack points while all Water Monsters lose 400 attack points. It is the counterpart of the fusion monster Fusionist (a fusion of Petite Angel and Mystical Sheep #2).
 Dark Chimera is a fire-breathing monster that lives in the Netherworld.
 Chimera the Flying Mythical Beast is a fusion of Berphomet and Gazelle the King of Mythical Beasts.
 Doll Chimera is a doll monster that gains 400 attack points for every Doll Part monsters in the graveyard.
 Scrap Chimera is a Scrap monster that has the head of a lion, the body of a pegasus, and a snake-headed tail. It is based on the Alchemical Chimera.
 Gladiator Beast Heraklinos is a humanoid Chimera who is the fusion of Gladiator Beast Laquari (a humanoid tiger) and any two Gladiator Beasts. Besides sporting the face, shoulders, and waist armor pieces of Gladiator Beast Laquari, Guardian Beast Heraklion sports the wings and hair of Guardian Beast Alexander (a humanoid winged lion), the lower body, tail, bone fragments, and halfbreed of Gladiator Beast Spartacus (a humanoid dinosaur), the upper waist armor pierce of Gladiator Beast Murmillo (a humanoid carp), the plates of Guardian Beast Hoplomus (a humanoid rhinoceros) for a shield, the upper body of Gladiator Beast Dimacari (a humanoid African buffalo) with his accessories as leg guards, the chest armor piece and winged armguards of Gladiator Beast Bestiari (a humanoid bird) with the spearhead attached to the halberd, the waist armor piece of Gladiator Beast Secutor (a humanoid lizard) with the cannons mounted on the shield, the upper legs of Gladiator Beast Darius (a humanoid horse), and the armored wings of Gladiator Beast Samnite (a humanoid winged smilodon).
 Chimaera, the Master of Beasts is more accurate to the mythical Chimera where it is a two-headed lion-like creature with different horns on its head, the wings of a bird, and the tail of a snake. It can only be summoned by sacrificing 3 beast-type monsters.
 In Ben 10, besides inorganic matter, Kevin Levin's Osmosian ability allow him to modify his own genetic structure by absorbing the energy of other aliens (which allows him to simultaneously scan, absorb, and infuse himself their DNA) acquiring 1/10 of that creature's powers (this is the biological limit for Osmosians) as well as the mutations needed for him to gain that creature's powers. If he were to attempt to absorb the energy and DNA of several aliens at once, or the transformative, gene-altering energy of the Omnitrix/Ultimatrix, he will mutate into a chimeric fusion of most, if not all of the aliens he has absorbed. His human DNA restores itself over time and will eventually overwrite the alien DNA completely, thus allowing him to return to his human form.
 In American Dragon: Jake Long, Jake and his friends battle a Chimera in a dreamrealm. It has three heads based on each of its component animals, the body of a humanoid lion, the legs of a goat, and the tail of a snake. The series creators list the Chimera as one of the 13 Greatest Threats of the magical world.
 In Kamen Rider Ryuki (and its adaptation Kamen Rider: Dragon Knight), Genocider that was feature the combination of Ouja's Venosnaker (Strike's Venosnaker), Gai's Metalgelas (Thrust's Metalgelas), and Raia's Evildiver (Sting' Evildiver).
 In Digimon Adventure 02, the Chosen Children face a Digimon called Kimeramon which had Kabuterimon's head, Angemon's top wings, Airdramon's wings, Garurumon's back legs, Monochromon's tail, one of Kuwagamon's leg arms, SkullGreymon's right arm, Devimon's arms, Greymon's body and eyes, and MetalGreymon's hair.
 The CSI: Crime Scene Investigation episode "Bloodlines" used a Chimera as an allegory for genetic chimerism, a condition from which one person may have two distinct DNA patterns.
 In MÄR: Märchen Awakens Romance, Chimera was the name of a member of the Chess Pieces.
 In the Japanese series Bleach, Tia Harribel's Facciones Apache, Mila-Rose, and Sun-Sun can sacrifice their arms as a last resort to create a Chimera-like enforcer called Ayon (shown with a deer's head and legs, a long lion-like mane, and a classic tail with a snake at the end).
 In The X-Files, there is an episode titled "Chimera" which takes place in Vermont.
 The NCIS season 5 episode 6 was titled "Chimera" and took place on the USNS Chimera, a top-secret naval research ship sailing in the middle of the ocean. On a related note, Ziva also mentions to Tony about what the mythical Chimera was.
 In the television series Star Trek: Deep Space Nine "Chimera" was the name of episode 714 in which Odo meets one of "The Hundred" changelings sent abroad in the universe by The Founders to learn more about other cultures and eventually return home.
 In Ultraman Taro Episode 40, the Ultra Brothers fought against a chimera monster named Tyrant, all the older brothers are overpowered until Ace managed to fire an Ultra Sign warning Taro and the earthlings of Tyrant. Taro would eventually defeat this monster with ease when the latter arrives on earth.
 Chimera, a 1991 British science fiction miniseries (in the US it was released as Monkey Boy).
 In The Godzilla Power Hour, Godzilla fought a chimera.
 In the Fullmetal Alchemist series, a chimera is any combination of animals, including humans, that have been alchemically transmuted to form one organism.
 In Code Geass a chimera is in heraldic badge of Holy Empire of Britannia.
 Although there were no affiliation to this creature, Kamen Rider OOO has chimera-like motif in the protagonist using "combos" with animal-themed "O Medals" and in hybrid Yummies.
 In Once Upon a Time episode "Lady of the Lake", Snow White, Emma and Lancelot have a meal at which Chimera meat is served. The animal is described as "one part lion, one part serpent, one part goat".
 In My Little Pony: Friendship is Magic, a chimera appears in the episode "Somepony to Watch Over Me", but it was part saber-tooth tiger, part goat, and part snake. The character Discord is also a chimera-like creature called a "draconequus" in the show, possessing a goat-like face, a lion paw, and a dragon-like body, among several other animal features.
 In Beyblade G-Revolution, the blader, Brooklyn, owns a bey called Zeus. Despite the name, it has more relation to the chimera due to its bit-beast, as the beast resembles a centaur-shaped chimera with a horse's body and legs, a raven's wings, and the upper torso of a lion with a white mane.
 In Hunter x Hunter, there is a species of ant known as the Chimera Ant whose queen possesses the ability to transplant the genetic traits of whatever she devoured into her offspring who become hybrid organisms.
 In Duel Masters (and its reimaged counterpart Kaijudo), the Chimeras are Darkness Civilization creature that are the creations of the Dark Lords.
 In Teen Wolf (season 5), the Dread Doctors 'make' Chimeras by combining existing supernatural creatures (like a werewolf-werecoyote hybrid and a werewolf-werejaguar hybrid) in experiments to create their own lethal monsters.
 In the third season of Star Wars Rebels, the "Chimaera" is used as the name of Grand Admiral Thrawn's flagship and as the emblem of the Seventh Fleet. A stylized engraving of the creature can be seen on the underside of the ship's hull.
On General Hospital, beginning on May 1, 2017, the Chimera is depicted in a drawing in a book Helena Cassadine gave to Elizabeth Weber, regarding her son, Jake's, missing 5 years...also, in a drawing done by Jake on a timeline he has been working on with Franco, regarding the same five years...and on a necklace Alex Devane Marick (portraying her twin sister Anna Devane) is wearing, given to her by Valentin Cassadine during their days with the DVX and WSB respectively. The link bringing all of this together has not yet been discovered.
 In Stargate SG-1 (season 7), there is an episode titled 'Chimera' in which Dr. Daniel Jackson is plagued with several dreams involving his past, pushed by Sarah Gardner to reveal the location of the Lost City.
The anime Monster Musume contains part human, part animal creatures.
The Japanese anime Tokyo Mew Mew features evil chimera animals that the main characters must fight to save society.
In Kékéflipnote's L'odyssée de Klassik series for Arte, the chimera was replace as the two bodied mole in the right and the panda on the left with the snake in its leg.
The 2021 Korean drama series Chimera on OCN starring Park Hae-Soo, Claudia Kim, and Lee Hee-Joon tells the story of a serial killer known as 'Chimera' who uses fire or any tool that can spit fire from various elements in chemistry; it is said that the killer is still unknown even after 35 years.
 In the anime Spy × Family, Anya Forger has a pink-green chimera plush toy, although the chimera here is more stylized with the goat parts represented only with horns on the lion's head.

Film
 Chimera is referenced when describing the shape-shifting guardian creature that follows and protects John Smith in the movie I Am Number Four.
 The character Beast from Disney's Beauty and the Beast is a Chimera-like creature, with the horns of a bison, brows of a gorilla, nose and mane of a lion, the back mane of a hyena, the tusks of a boar, the arms and chest of a bear and the hind legs and tail of a wolf.
 In the second installment of the Mission: Impossible series, known as Mission: Impossible 2 (2000), a pharmaceutical company creates a virus called Chimera in order to generate a market demand for the antidote it also created called Bellerophon.
 In the film The Relic, the Kothoga, the creature derived from the Brazilian relic statue is described to Sizemore's character as a Chimera. The Kothoga is a modern incarnation of the mythological Chimera.
 In Synecdoche, New York (2008), the character Sammy Barnathan (Tom Noonan), while imitating the main character, Caden Cotard (Philip Seymour Hoffman), says to Hazel (Samantha Morton), "I want to fuck you until we merge into a chimera, a mythical beast with penis and vagina eternally fused, two pairs of eyes that look only at each other, and lips — ever touching — and yet one voice that whispers to itself."
 A Chimera appears in the 2012 film Wrath of the Titans as the first creature Perseus fights and is presented as a colossal double-headed beast with huge bat wings. Although it still has the body of a lion and a serpent head on its tail, the creature's two main heads do not bear any particular resemblance to either a lion or a goat, although the left head does bear a single horn on its forehead. The creature uses its two heads together in order to breathe fire, with the horned head spewing a flammable liquid and the other head producing the spark to ignite the fuel.
 In Animal Crackers, the film's main villain Horatio P. Huntington ate the pieces of the animal crackers which turned him into a Chimera. This form has the head of a lion, the horns of a bighorn sheep, the body of a crocodile, the wings of a bat, the tail of a snake, and six unspecified limbs.
 Chimera is the name of the gas stations that give away the game piece cards in the 1991 film Motorama.

Video games
 In the video game series Golden Sun, the Chimera appears numerous times. First as a pair of bosses on Crossbone Isle, then as a normal enemy under the names Chimera Mage. In Golden Sun: The Lost Age, the stronger Grand Chimera was a boss. All forms are Mars(Fire) creatures, and have a goat's body, a snake for a tail, and the head of a lion and an eagle instead of knees on their forelegs.
 In Ōkami, Chimeras appear and turtle-like steam pot beasts who classify as level two out of three in difficulty to defeat.
 In Rastan Saga there are some Chimerae during the levels.
 In SaGa Frontier, Chimeras are enemies that can be randomly encountered throughout portions of the game. Their appearance consists of many creatures: the torso and head of a bear, a single head of a raptor on the end of each arm, the back legs of a raptor, and the front half of a bull for front legs.
 In Gauntlet Legends, the player(s) must face a large Chimera as the boss of the second level, the Castle Stronghold.
 In Suikoden II and Suikoden III, Chimeras appear as enemies that can be encountered at random. They are monsters that have three heads (a bird, a goat and a lion), bat-like wings and a snake's tail.
 In Castlevania: Legacy of Darkness when facing Ortega, he transforms into a chimera. shown as a winged creature with a lion head breathing fire, a snakehead spitting poison and a bird head using a sonic attack.
 The Chimera is a monster in the works of Artix Entertainment:
 The Chimera is featured in AdventureQuest where it has the head and front legs of a lion, the head and back legs of a goat, the head of a dragon, and a snake-headed tail. The Chimera is the creation of a deranged sorcerer.
 In AdventureQuest Worlds, the Chimera of Vadriel is a dragon-like pet with goat-like horns and a snake-headed tail. The Chimera Familiar is a pet that was associated with a bunch of witches according to its bio. Its character model was used for the Chimera in Northpointe and Void Challenge.
 In the MMORPG game Wizard101 the Chimera is a winged creature and is a spell of the magic school Balance. Wizard players can use this on their foes. The dragon head uses Myth damage, the lion head does Life damage, and the goat head does Death damage.
 Chimeras appear as random creatures in the Final Fantasy series with various descriptions for each one:
 In the original Final Fantasy, up to four could be encountered at once. It is shown to have three heads (a lion head, a goat head, a dragon head), the wings of a dragon, and the body of a goat.
 In Final Fantasy II, a Chimera serves as a boss and later appears as a random creature encounter. It is shown to have three heads (a lion head, a goat head, and a dragon head), the wings of a dragon, and the body of a lion.
 In Final Fantasy III, a Chimera appears as a random encounter in the skies of the surface world.
 In the game Final Fantasy IV, Chimera are also random creature encounters in the Tower of Babil. They have three heads (a lion head, a goat head, and a dragon head) and the body of a goat. It attacks with Blaze.
 In Final Fantasy V, the Dhorme Chimera is a randomly encountered enemy. Not only does it have the heads of a lion, goat, and dragon, it has the front legs of a lion, the wings of a dragon, the back legs of a goat, and a snake-headed tail.
 In Final Fantasy VI, the Chimera is shown to have 5 heads (a lion head, a goat head, a dragon head, an eagle head, a boar head), the wings of a dragon, the front legs of a lion, the back legs of a goat, and a snake-headed tail.
 In Final Fantasy VII, the Maximum Chimera is a randomly encountered enemy.
 In Final Fantasy VIII, the Chimera is a randomly encountered enemy with four heads (a lion head, a goat head, a hawk head, a lizard head), the body of a lion, the wings of a dragon, and a cobra-headed tail.
 In Final Fantasy IX, it is a three-headed demon that is tough to beat.
 In Final Fantasy X and Final Fantasy X-2, there are random creature encounters that are Chimera. They have a bull head, a wolf head, a griffin head, a snake-headed tail, and have what appears to be somewhat like a bull's upright body. To attack, they use a combination of elements (fire, water, lightning).
 In Final Fantasy XI, Khimaira (Similar sound to Chimera) is a High Notorious Monster. With a head of a lion and a tail of a serpent, it has the horns of a goat.
 In Dragon Quest, a feather-shaped item allowing inter-city travel is called Chimera Wing.
 In GrimGrimoire, one of the most powerful Alchemy-based units is a Chimera, which takes the form of an enormous spinning spider with a gaping lion's head at its center. It can be upgraded into consuming ally units in order to heal itself.
 In Blue Dragon Plus, a Chimera appears as the Shadow creature of Nene, one of the game's playable characters and the main antagonist of the original Blue Dragon game.
 In Tekken 3, the final boss, True Ogre, takes on the form of a Chimera-like demon, with the horns of a ram, skin like a dragon, the head of a lion with mandibles, and his right arm with various snakes.
 In Resident Evil 4, when first entering the castle stage of the game, there is an obstacle that requires three ornaments to unlock it. After retrieving the three pieces, one of Lion, Goat, and Snake, the puzzle reveals itself as a Chimera.
 The Chimera are the primary antagonists in Resistance: Fall of Man, Resistance 2, Resistance: Burning Skies, and Resistance: Retribution. They're an "alien" race that are trying to eliminate the human race and resembling pale, humanoid creatures with 2-6 yellow eyes and infect humans with the Chimeran Virus. They are finally defeated in Resistance 3 when the wormhole above New York is closed off after the New York tower is destroyed and they lost their cohesion, allowing humanity to finally defeat the Chimera and rebuild their shattered world.
 In Act of Aggression, Chimera is the multinational task force formed by the United Nations, armed with several types of foreign equipment, and which works in secrecy.
 In Mother 3, Chimeras are corrupted animals that were engineered by the main antagonist's "Pigmask Army" as a result of either combining them with other species or adding mechanical parts, which appear as bosses throughout the game. One of these Chimera, named The Ultimate Chimera, appears occasionally in the New Pork City stage in Super Smash Bros. Brawl.
 In Shining Force, the chimera are very powerful and dangerous enemies near at the end of the game, lion torso and head, the wings of the dragon, goat's head and snake tail and the goat head have an ability to breathe the fire can inflict massive damage on their opponent there only weakness is the ice.
 In Warcraft III and World of Warcraft The Chimaera is seen as a creature with a winged lion body, two dragon heads with goat horns and two tails that seem to have scorpion type stingers on them. In Warcraft III the Night Elves can train them as flying siege beasts from a late game structure. Examples: .
 In World of Warcraft one of the bosses in the Blackwing Descent raid in the Cataclysm expansion is a 2-headed dragon called Chimaeron, named after this mythical creature.
 In Altered Beast: Guardian of the Realms, in the two last levels, Dreamscape and Palace of the Gods, you play as the Chimera. It is shown to have a snake-like bottom, lion torso, dragon's wings and goat horns. It attacks using fists and sonic waves.
 In Age of Mythology, the chimera is a trainable myth unit under the worship of Artemis.
 In God of War III, Kratos (the game's protagonist) fights the Chimera as a mini boss on Mt. Olympus and later fights many more on the way to Tartarus. It bears a lion's face on its "chest," with the three-horned, demonic-looking goat's head as the "normal" one on top of the lion head, and the snake in its usual position as the tail. Kratos must destroy each of these "heads" through brief quick time events to defeat the creature.
 In S.T.A.L.K.E.R.: Call of Pripyat chimeras are large, orthrus-like dogs with no fur, large bodies, two heads and a broad tail.  Chimeras are also known to possess the body and posture of a lion, the roar of a bear, and one face that somewhat bears a visage of a human head with the other one, a cat creature.
 In Titan Quest, the Chimera is encountered as a boss in the Temple of Marduk in the Orient (Act III). 
 In Fallout New Vegas you encounter dog-like creatures called Night Stalkers that were created by splicing the DNA of dogs and Rattlesnakes together.
 In Demon's Souls the second boss at the Tower Of Latria is a beast with the body of a humanoid lion and a tail with a snakes head on the end that bites the lion temporarily increasing its power.
 You face Chimeras in the upcoming game "Scarab" you fight them four times first on the level "Export", second on the level "Call For The God", Third "Resistance Over The Titans", and last you face the Chimera while facing Apollo in the Titan Temple on the level "Modern War"
 In the space MMO Eve Online the carrier class capital ship of the Caldari race is named after the Chimera.
 In Dragon's Dogma, Chimeras are common boss creatures that the player can find throughout the world.
 The Chimera appears in Bloody Roar series as the Zoanthrope of the character Uranus. Uranus appears and stays as a secret character since Bloody Roar 3. Uranus is known as the strongest Zoanthrope because of her transformation where he form has the tails of a lion, the horns of a goat.
 In Borderlands, the Chimera is a legendary revolver manufactured by the Atlas Corporation that possesses all four elemental weapon effects. It fires explosive rounds by default, but has the chance to fire either incendiary, shock, or corrosive rounds instead.
 Chimera appear in Chapter 12 in Xenoblade Chronicles X as the Lifehold's internal defensive measure. They appear lizard-like with the ability to breathe fire. The final boss itself also falls into the game's Chimeroid category and is more of a visible hybrid than others in the same group and is a mixture of DNA from every lifeform on Earth, showing reptile, bird and human parts with a bear's roar.
 Pokémon Sun and Moon features two Pokémon, Type: Null and Silvally, which are able to change their typing by holding a memory drive. They were created using the cells of all known Pokémon and are based on a Chimera.
 In the MMORPG Star Trek Online, Veteran and lifetime players can obtain a Chimera class Heavy Destroyer. The design, a passed over submission for the flagship Enterprise F, is an escort with elements of a cruiser and science ships without being either, therefore a blending of Tactical, Engineer, and Science orientations.
 In the MMORPG City of Heroes, Chimera was the Praetorian world version of Freedom Phalanx hero Manticore.
 In the game The Last Guardian, you play as young boy navigating through various puzzles with a creature named Trico. Trico appears to be a griffin-like chimera with the head of a cat, with body features and a beak similar to a bird.
 One of the bosses in the game Rage of the Gladiator named 'Gargadan' is based on a Chimera. It is a hybrid of a tiger, snake, and dragon, with three corresponding heads.
 In Terraria, there is an enemy called Chimera from the crimson biome.
 The 9th expansion for Tom Clancy's Rainbow Six Siege is named Operation Chimera.
 In Path of Exile Chimera is one of four guardians of The Shaper, along with Hydra, Minotaur and Phoenix.
 The setting of the 1992 computer game Harlequin is named Chimerica, which is a portmanteau of "chimera" and America.
 In Marvel's Avengers the name of the Avenger's helicarrier is the Chimera.

Role-playing
 In the roleplaying game Dungeons & Dragons, the chimera is an evil-aligned creature which looks like a lion with leathery wings on its back. To either side of its lion's head is the head of a goat and the head of a dragon. The chimera and some variants appears through all editions as well as in the Pathfinder Roleplaying Game. There is also a version of the Chimera called the Gorgimera which is the result of a union between a Chimera and Gorgon with the goat parts replaced with the Gorgon parts.
 Exalted Uses the term to refer to people or creatures who have suffered numerous mutations from the Wyld (the uncontrolled chaos beyond the edge of reality). Most commonly; it refers to Lunar Exalted who never received an extensive array of moonsilver tattoos on their bodies, expressly meant to prevent Wyld mutations but also to stop the Lunar's own shapeshifting abilities from mutating them.  Without the tattoos, they risk gaining a permanent mutation each time they change form and will eventually become an insane, ravening beast resembling an amalgam of about a dozen different creatures.

Books
 Chimeras were mentioned in the Harry Potter books. In Fantastic Beasts and Where to Find Them, it is described to have a lion head, a goat body, and dragon tail. The Ministry of Magic classifies them as XXXXX (very dangerous). It is said that Bellerophon (not mentioned by name) was the only one who ever managed to kill a Chimera and shortly after fell to his death from the winged horse due to exhaustion. Also in Harry Potter and the Deathly Hallows, Elphias Doge is said to have encountered Chimeras in Greece.
 The Chimera was featured as a story element in The Tomb of Dracula. Its first appearance was in issue #26, and it also appears two issues later. CHIMERA - magic power item in three pieces (serpent's tail, lion's head, goat's body), created ?30,000? (20,000 more likely) years ago in Atlantis by C'Thunda, used against Kull, involved in the times of the Black Death, sought in recent times by Dracula + Doctor Sun + David Eschol, destroyed by Sheila Wittier to prevent either Dracula or Doctor Sun from using it. Apparently, in The Tomb of Dracula #26, King Kull appeared or was referenced in a flashback. The cosmic-powered Chimera and a Legion of Doom unlike any other item in creation, that causes havoc for our heroes.
 Conan encounters a Chimera-like beast in the Marvel Comic adaption of The Flame Winds of Wan Tengri by Norvell Page.
 In Alan Dean Foster's Mad Amos short story, "Witchen Woes", Amos Malone defeats a "kitchen witch" in a cooking contest by making "chimera chili". He later commented that the hardest part of the recipe was finding chimera meat.
 In James Patterson's novel part of the Women's Murder Club series 2nd Chance, the murderer uses a chimera symbol.
 In Laurell K. Hamilton's novel Narcissus in Chains, part of the Anita Blake series, the antagonist is known as Chimera, a panware capable of shifting into several were-animals. Those animals included lion, cobra, leopard, wolf and bear.
 In Timothy Zahn's Thrawn trilogy, Grand Admiral Thrawn's flagship was called the Chimaera. 
 In Piers Anthony's novel Chthon, a chimera kills stragglers from a party of travelers. Quote: "The chimera is the enemy you *don't* see".
 In Marjorie Liu's Dirk and Steele series, in the book The Fire King, the main male character Karr is a Chimera, being the offspring of two shapeshifters of different animals.  His mother was a dragon and his father was a lion.
 Amazonian warrior women ride Chimera in Wonder Woman: Amazons Attack!
 In nthWORD, chimeras are regularly used to illustrate stories, including "Me and Sally" by David Henry Sterry in issue #5 and "Being Jewish in a Small Town" by Lyn Lifshin in issue #7.
 In the first installment of the book series Percy Jackson & the Olympians titled The Lightning Thief, Percy Jackson battles the Chimera and his mother Echidna at the top of Gateway Arch in St. Louis, Missouri. It is described as having the head of a lion with a blood-caked mane, the body of a goat, and the tail of a 10 ft. diamondback snake where it sports a venomous bite. After being bitten by the Chimera, Percy Jackson escapes into the Mississippi River. It was mentioned that the Chimera that Bellerophon fought was the size of a woolly mammoth.
 In the series by Laini Taylor Daughter of Smoke and Bone, the chimera (spelled chimaera) being these creatures who raised the main protagonist, Karou, from birth.
 Throughout the Lorien Legacies series, a chimera named Bernie Kosar (after the football player) is the pet of the main character, John Smith/Number Four. However, chimeras are simply shapeshifters in this series.
 See also Chimera for various books with this title.
 In the Supernatural novel Cold Fire, protagonists Sam and Dean Winchester face off with the mythical Chimera after its blood creates hybrids between people and two different kinds of animals like the Minotaur, a snake woman, an ape man, a lobster man, and other hybrids. The Winchesters kill the Chimera by severing all of its different body parts and then burning them.
 In the fourth installment of the book series The Seven Fabulous Wonders, The Mausoleum Murder, Alexis brings the creature to life.
 In the second book of the Between States series by Sean Catt, Jake Palmer the cougar shapeshifter main character, encounters a chimera in an ex US army research facility currently being run by a biotech company intent on creating a new super soldier.
 Chimera is the name of the "alien" antagonists in Resistance: The Gathering Storm and Resistance: A Hole in the Sky, both written by American author William C. Dietz, based on the video game series Resistance (video game series). Gathering Storm takes place in between the events of Resistance: Fall of Man and Resistance 2, and A Hole in the Sky takes place in between the events of Resistance 2 and Resistance 3

Further reading
Tracking Classical Monsters in Popular Culture by Liz Gloyn, Bloomsbury Publishing (2019)
The Classical Tradition by Anthony Grafton et al., Harvard University Press (2010)
Mythical and Fabulous Creatures: A Source Book and Research Guide by Malcolm South, Greenwood Press (1987)
The Ashgate Encyclopedia of Literary and Cinematic Monsters by Jeffrey Weinstock (ed.), Ashgate Publishing (2014)

References 
  Some of the content in this article was copied from Chimera at the Riordan wiki, which is licensed under the Creative Commons Attribution-Share Alike 3.0 (Unported) (CC-BY-SA 3.0) license.

Classical mythology in popular culture
Legendary creatures in popular culture